The 1987–88 Philadelphia Flyers season was the Philadelphia Flyers' 21st season in the National Hockey League (NHL). The Flyers lost in the first round of the playoffs to the Washington Capitals in seven games.

Regular season
The season was one of many ups and downs. With Ron Hextall lost to an eight-game suspension to start the year after slashing Kent Nilsson in the Stanley Cup Finals, Tim Kerr lost indefinitely with a shoulder problem, and Brad McCrimmon traded to Calgary over a salary dispute, the club limped to a 3–6–2 record in October. Additionally, Dave Brown served a 15-game suspension for cross-checking New York Ranger Tomas Sandstrom in the face on October 26.

The free-fall continued until late November. After blowing a 4–1 lead into a 6–4 loss to the Islanders at home on November 21, the Flyers were at 6–13–3 and last in the division. However, just as quickly, the club rebounded with a 14-game unbeaten streak (12–0–2) from November 25 to December 26 – despite losing out to the Pittsburgh Penguins in the Paul Coffey sweepstakes. The run was highlighted by Hextall becoming the first goaltender to shoot the puck into the opposing team's net on December 8, a game-winning two-man short tally by Murray Craven in Winnipeg on December 13, and a post-Christmas comeback win against the Capitals.

A 6–0–1 run through late February and early March saw Rick Tocchet post three hat tricks in a span of four games (Detroit, at Los Angeles, at Vancouver). On February 23, the club set a still-standing franchise road record with 11 goals in an amazing 11–6 win in Detroit, including a team-record 7 third-period tallies.

After a 7–3 win over the Canucks March 1, the Flyers finished the year in free-fall due to almost daily injuries, going 4–11–2, ending up the lower seed in a second-place tie with Washington. Kerr returned to the lineup finally on March 10, but was unable to find his range before the playoffs began.

Season standings

Playoffs
In their first round playoff series with the Washington Capitals, the Flyers blew a 3–1 series lead as Washington forced a Game 7. They then blew a 3–0 lead in Game 7 as Washington won 5-4, in overtime.

Afterwards, general manager Bobby Clarke fired head coach Mike Keenan citing a lack of enthusiasm from the club to continue playing for him.

Schedule and results

Regular season

|- style="background:#ffc;"
| 1 || October 8 || Montreal Canadiens || 2–2 OT || 0–0–1 || 1 || 
|- style="background:#cfc;"
| 2 || October 10 || @ Minnesota North Stars || 5–4 || 1–0–1 || 3 || 
|- style="background:#fcf;"
| 3 || October 11 || Chicago Blackhawks || 3–5 || 1–1–1 || 3 || 
|- style="background:#fcf;"
| 4 || October 15 || New York Islanders || 0–6 || 1–2–1 || 3 || 
|- style="background:#cfc;"
| 5 || October 17 || @ New York Islanders || 4–3 || 2–2–1 || 5 || 
|- style="background:#cfc;"
| 6 || October 18 || Pittsburgh Penguins || 3–2 || 3–2–1 || 7 || 
|- style="background:#fcf;"
| 7 || October 22 || Washington Capitals || 1–4 || 3–3–1 || 7 || 
|- style="background:#fcf;"
| 8 || October 24 || New York Rangers || 3–5 || 3–4–1 || 7 || 
|- style="background:#ffc;"
| 9 || October 26 || @ New York Rangers || 2–2 OT || 3–4–2 || 8 || 
|- style="background:#fcf;"
| 10 || October 27 || @ New Jersey Devils || 0–4 || 3–5–2 || 8 || 
|- style="background:#fcf;"
| 11 || October 31 || @ Hartford Whalers || 4–7 || 3–6–2 || 8 || 
|-

|- style="background:#cfc;"
| 12 || November 1 || Los Angeles Kings || 4–1 || 4–6–2 || 10 || 
|- style="background:#fcf;"
| 13 || November 3 || @ Pittsburgh Penguins || 1–5 || 4–7–2 || 10 || 
|- style="background:#fcf;"
| 14 || November 5 || Vancouver Canucks || 3–4 || 4–8–2 || 10 || 
|- style="background:#fcf;"
| 15 || November 7 || @ Montreal Canadiens || 4–5 || 4–9–2 || 10 || 
|- style="background:#ffc;"
| 16 || November 8 || New Jersey Devils || 3–3 OT || 4–9–3 || 11 || 
|- style="background:#fcf;"
| 17 || November 10 || @ St. Louis Blues || 2–5 || 4–10–3 || 11 || 
|- style="background:#cfc;"
| 18 || November 12 || Pittsburgh Penguins || 5–2 || 5–10–3 || 13 || 
|- style="background:#fcf;"
| 19 || November 14 || Toronto Maple Leafs || 0–6 || 5–11–3 || 13 || 
|- style="background:#fcf;"
| 20 || November 18 || @ New Jersey Devils || 3–4 || 5–12–3 || 13 || 
|- style="background:#cfc;"
| 21 || November 19 || Los Angeles Kings || 7–5 || 6–12–3 || 15 || 
|- style="background:#fcf;"
| 22 || November 21 || New York Islanders || 4–6 || 6–13–3 || 15 || 
|- style="background:#cfc;"
| 23 || November 25 || Buffalo Sabres || 5–2 || 7–13–3 || 17 || 
|- style="background:#cfc;"
| 24 || November 28 || @ Quebec Nordiques || 6–3 || 8–13–3 || 19 || 
|-

|- style="background:#cfc;"
| 25 || December 3 || Hartford Whalers || 5–2 || 9–13–3 || 21 || 
|- style="background:#ffc;"
| 26 || December 6 || New Jersey Devils || 1–1 OT || 9–13–4 || 22 || 
|- style="background:#cfc;"
| 27 || December 8 || Boston Bruins || 5–2 || 10–13–4 || 24 || 
|- style="background:#cfc;"
| 28 || December 10 || New York Rangers || 5–3 || 11–13–4 || 26 || 
|- style="background:#ffc;"
| 29 || December 11 || @ Detroit Red Wings || 3–3 OT || 11–13–5 || 27 || 
|- style="background:#cfc;"
| 30 || December 13 || @ Winnipeg Jets || 4–3 || 12–13–5 || 29 || 
|- style="background:#cfc;"
| 31 || December 15 || @ Pittsburgh Penguins || 5–2 || 13–13–5 || 31 || 
|- style="background:#cfc;"
| 32 || December 17 || New York Islanders || 4–3 || 14–13–5 || 33 || 
|- style="background:#cfc;"
| 33 || December 19 || @ New York Islanders || 5–4 || 15–13–5 || 35 || 
|- style="background:#cfc;"
| 34 || December 22 || @ New York Rangers || 6–4 || 16–13–5 || 37 || 
|- style="background:#cfc;"
| 35 || December 23 || Minnesota North Stars || 5–3 || 17–13–5 || 39 || 
|- style="background:#cfc;"
| 36 || December 26 || @ Washington Capitals || 3–2 || 18–13–5 || 41 || 
|- style="background:#fcf;"
| 37 || December 30 || @ Edmonton Oilers || 0–6 || 18–14–5 || 41 || 
|- style="background:#fcf;"
| 38 || December 31 || @ Calgary Flames || 4–5 || 18–15–5 || 41 || 
|-

|- style="background:#cfc;"
| 39 || January 2 || @ Vancouver Canucks || 4–1 || 19–15–5 || 43 || 
|- style="background:#fcf;"
| 40 || January 5 || Washington Capitals || 1–3 || 19–16–5 || 43 || 
|- style="background:#cfc;"
| 41 || January 7 || St. Louis Blues || 6–4 || 20–16–5 || 45 || 
|- style="background:#ffc;"
| 42 || January 9 || @ Montreal Canadiens || 3–3 OT || 20–16–6 || 46 || 
|- style="background:#fcf;"
| 43 || January 10 || New Jersey Devils || 5–7 || 20–17–6 || 46 || 
|- style="background:#cfc;"
| 44 || January 14 || Buffalo Sabres || 3–1 || 21–17–6 || 48 || 
|- style="background:#cfc;"
| 45 || January 15 || @ Pittsburgh Penguins || 5–4 || 22–17–6 || 50 || 
|- style="background:#cfc;"
| 46 || January 17 || @ New York Rangers || 2–1 || 23–17–6 || 52 || 
|- style="background:#cfc;"
| 47 || January 21 || Edmonton Oilers || 3–1 || 24–17–6 || 54 || 
|- style="background:#cfc;"
| 48 || January 23 || @ Boston Bruins || 6–4 || 25–17–6 || 56 || 
|- style="background:#fcf;"
| 49 || January 24 || Minnesota North Stars || 3–5 || 25–18–6 || 56 || 
|- style="background:#fcf;"
| 50 || January 28 || New York Rangers || 2–5 || 25–19–6 || 56 || 
|- style="background:#cfc;"
| 51 || January 30 || Winnipeg Jets || 4–3 || 26–19–6 || 58 || 
|- style="background:#fcf;"
| 52 || January 31 || @ Washington Capitals || 0–1 OT || 26–20–6 || 58 || 
|-

|- style="background:#cfc;"
| 53 || February 4 || Toronto Maple Leafs || 6–1 || 27–20–6 || 60 || 
|- style="background:#cfc;"
| 54 || February 6 || @ St. Louis Blues || 4–2 || 28–20–6 || 62 || 
|- style="background:#fcf;"
| 55 || February 12 || Calgary Flames || 2–3 || 28–21–6 || 62 || 
|- style="background:#fcf;"
| 56 || February 13 || @ Toronto Maple Leafs || 4–7 || 28–22–6 || 62 || 
|- style="background:#cfc;"
| 57 || February 15 || Hartford Whalers || 5–4 OT || 29–22–6 || 64 || 
|- style="background:#ffc;"
| 58 || February 18 || New York Islanders || 3–3 OT || 29–22–7 || 65 || 
|- style="background:#cfc;"
| 59 || February 19 || @ Buffalo Sabres || 5–4 || 30–22–7 || 67 || 
|- style="background:#cfc;"
| 60 || February 21 || Detroit Red Wings || 5–3 || 31–22–7 || 69 || 
|- style="background:#cfc;"
| 61 || February 23 || @ Detroit Red Wings || 11–6 || 32–22–7 || 71 || 
|- style="background:#cfc;"
| 62 || February 27 || @ Los Angeles Kings || 8–6 || 33–22–7 || 73 || 
|-

|- style="background:#cfc;"
| 63 || March 1 || @ Vancouver Canucks || 7–3 || 34–22–7 || 75 || 
|- style="background:#fcf;"
| 64 || March 3 || @ Calgary Flames || 3–6 || 34–23–7 || 75 || 
|- style="background:#fcf;"
| 65 || March 4 || @ Edmonton Oilers || 4–7 || 34–24–7 || 75 || 
|- style="background:#fcf;"
| 66 || March 6 || @ New Jersey Devils || 2–4 || 34–25–7 || 75 || 
|- style="background:#cfc;"
| 67 || March 10 || Washington Capitals || 5–2 || 35–25–7 || 77 || 
|- style="background:#fcf;"
| 68 || March 12 || New Jersey Devils || 5–6 || 35–26–7 || 77 || 
|- style="background:#fcf;"
| 69 || March 13 || @ Chicago Blackhawks || 4–5 OT || 35–27–7 || 77 || 
|- style="background:#fcf;"
| 70 || March 15 || @ New York Rangers || 1–3 || 35–28–7 || 77 || 
|- style="background:#fcf;"
| 71 || March 17 || Chicago Blackhawks || 3–4 OT || 35–29–7 || 77 || 
|- style="background:#fcf;"
| 72 || March 19 || @ Pittsburgh Penguins || 0–7 || 35–30–7 || 77 || 
|- style="background:#cfc;"
| 73 || March 20 || Pittsburgh Penguins || 4–2 || 36–30–7 || 79 || 
|- style="background:#fcf;"
| 74 || March 22 || Boston Bruins || 0–3 || 36–31–7 || 79 || 
|- style="background:#fcf;"
| 75 || March 25 || @ Washington Capitals || 3–5 || 36–32–7 || 79 || 
|- style="background:#cfc;"
| 76 || March 26 || Winnipeg Jets || 6–0 || 37–32–7 || 81 || 
|- style="background:#fcf;"
| 77 || March 29 || @ New York Islanders || 3–5 || 37–33–7 || 81 || 
|- style="background:#ffc;"
| 78 || March 31 || Quebec Nordiques || 4–4 OT || 37–33–8 || 82 || 
|-

|- style="background:#cfc;"
| 79 || April 2 || @ Quebec Nordiques || 7–4 || 38–33–8 || 84 || 
|- style="background:#ffc;"
| 80 || April 3 || Washington Capitals || 2–2 OT || 38–33–9 || 85 || 
|-

|-
| Legend:

Playoffs

|- style="background:#cfc;"
| 1 || April 6 || @ Washington Capitals || 4–2 || Flyers lead 1–0 || 
|- style="background:#fcf;"
| 2 || April 7 || @ Washington Capitals || 4–5 || Series tied 1–1 || 
|- style="background:#cfc;"
| 3 || April 9 || Washington Capitals || 4–3 || Flyers lead 2–1 || 
|- style="background:#cfc;"
| 4 || April 10 || Washington Capitals || 5–4 OT || Flyers lead 3–1 || 
|- style="background:#fcf;"
| 5 || April 12 || @ Washington Capitals || 2–5 || Flyers lead 3–2 || 
|- style="background:#fcf;"
| 6 || April 14 || Washington Capitals || 2–7 || Series tied 3–3 || 
|- style="background:#fcf;"
| 7 || April 16 || @ Washington Capitals || 4–5 OT || Capitals win 4–3 || 
|-

|-
| Legend:

Player statistics

Scoring
 Position abbreviations: C = Center; D = Defense; G = Goaltender; LW = Left Wing; RW = Right Wing
  = Joined team via a transaction (e.g., trade, waivers, signing) during the season. Stats reflect time with the Flyers only.
  = Left team via a transaction (e.g., trade, waivers, release) during the season. Stats reflect time with the Flyers only.

Goaltending

Awards and records

Awards

Records

Among the team records set during the 1987–88 season was the nine consecutive wins by goaltender Ron Hextall from December 8 to December 26, tying a team record. On February 23, the Flyers scored the fastest five goals in team history, taking five minutes and twenty-nine seconds to do so.  On February 27, Rick Tocchet scored four goals to tie the team record. The eight-game road losing streak from March 3 to March 29 is tied for the longest in team history. On March 19, Don Nachbaur took a team record eight penalties. Mark Howe set a single season high for powerplay goals scored by a defenseman (8, later tied). The 208 goals allowed by Hextall is a single season high for a Flyers goaltender. The team’s three road ties is tied for the fewest in franchise history. The 31 goals allowed during their division semifinal series against the Washington Capitals is the most allowed during any playoff series the Flyers have played.

Transactions
The Flyers were involved in the following transactions from June 1, 1987, the day after the deciding game of the 1987 Stanley Cup Finals, through May 26, 1988, the day of the deciding game of the 1988 Stanley Cup Finals.

Trades

Players acquired

Players lost

Signings

Draft picks

NHL Entry Draft
Philadelphia's picks at the 1987 NHL Entry Draft, which was held at Joe Louis Arena in Detroit, Michigan, on June 13, 1987. The Flyers traded their second-round pick, 41st overall, to the Detroit Red Wings for Mark Laforest on June 13, 1987.

NHL Supplemental Draft
Philadelphia's picks at the 1987 NHL Supplemental Draft.

Farm teams
The Flyers were affiliated with the Hershey Bears of the AHL and the Flint Spirits of the IHL. Led by the Louis A. R. Pieri Memorial Award winner as coach of the year (John Paddock), the Eddie Shore Award winner as top defenseman (Dave Fenyves), and the Aldege "Baz" Bastien Memorial Award as top goaltender (Wendell Young), Hershey finished first in their division and swept their way through the playoffs with a 12–0 record to a Calder Cup championship. Young was given the Jack A. Butterfield Trophy as playoff MVP. In their only season as a Flyers affiliate, Flint finished fourth in the playoffs and lost in the finals to the Salt Lake Golden Eagles in six games.

Notes

References
General
 
 
 
Specific

1987–88 NHL season by team
1987–88 in American ice hockey by team
1987
Philadelphia
Philadelphia